Joonas Lepistö (born 22 June 1998) is a Finnish professional footballer who plays for Inter Turku, as a striker.

Club career
On 7 December 2021, he signed a two-year contract with Inter Turku.

References

1998 births
Living people
Finnish footballers
People from Seinäjoki
Seinäjoen Jalkapallokerho players
FC Inter Turku players
Veikkausliiga players
Association football forwards
Sportspeople from South Ostrobothnia